Sai of Wa  (済) was a king of Wa in the middle of the 5th century (Kofun era). He was also known as 'Wa Osai'.

Father of Ko and Wu, he was one of the Wa. He is considered to be the 19th Emperor Ingyo.

Records

Book of Liang 

 The Biography of Liang
 In the  Book of Liang, the article on "Yamato" (梁書倭伝) states that his son Je stood up after the death of "Ya", and his son Xing stood up after his death.。

History of the Southern Dynasties 
In the History of the Southern Dynasties, the article on the Japanese Kingdom (Nan shi wagu den) describes the contents of the Song Shu Chronicles.

Historical investigation

On the continuity between Je and Chin 
In the article in the Sung Shu, Je takes the surname "Wa" (倭) as did the previous Japanese king Jin, but does not clarify his relationship to Jin. Since they do not name the continuation, there is a theory that Je and Chin were not close blood relatives, and since the Nihon Shoki shows a struggle in the succession to the throne after Emperor Nintoku, the possibility of the existence of such a struggle over the throne is pointed out  In addition, since the  can be seen as a particularly powerful royal family in the Chin period, there is a theory that there were two royal forces at that time (Mozu Kofun Cluster and Furuichi Kofun Cluster), and that Je may have been a lineage of this Wazui 。

Comparison of the tombs 
During the period of activity of the Five Kings of Japan, the tombs of the great kings were constructed in the Mozu Tombs and Furuichi Kofun Cluster (Osaka Prefecture, Sakai City, Habikino City, Fujiidera), and Je's tomb is assumed to be one of them.

(or Chin), since he is self-explanatory only by writing "Wang". It should be noted, however, that the iron sword from Inariyama burial mound inscription and the  inscription are distinct from the "Great King" of the Inariyama Sword。

References

Bibliography 

 事典類
 
 
 
 坂元義種 「倭の五王」、「済」。
 
  - リンクは朝日新聞社「コトバンク」。
 その他文献

See also 
 Five kings of Wa
 Emperor Ingyō

External links 
 漢籍電子文献資料庫 - 台湾中央研究院

Five kings of Wa
Pages with unreviewed translations